List of events in 2015 in esports (also known as professional gaming).

Calendar of events

(for extended events the final date is listed)

References

 
Esports by year